Vernon, Mississippi may refer to:
 Vernon, Jasper County, Mississippi
 Vernon, Madison County, Mississippi
 Vernon, Winston County, Mississippi